Ariane Tabatabai (born in Tabriz) is an Iranian-American scholar of political science, writer, and senior policy advisor to the United States Department of Defense. She is a graduate of King's College London and the daughter of Javad Tabatabai, an Iranian philosopher and professor at Tehran University.
Tabatabai is also a former researcher of "RAND Corporation" think tank, curriculum director and associate professor of security studies at Georgetown University, an international civilian consultant for NATO, the Middle East Fellow at the Alliance for Securing Democracy at the German Marshall Fund of the United States and several other research institutes.

Tabatabai, in an article in the Foreign Policy magazine before the 2020 US presidential election, argued that Iran's economy is fragile and will be forced to negotiate, agree and make concessions, demanding that the winning US presidential candidate not return to the nuclear agreement and pressure for more points.

After the Biden administration took office in January 2021, she joined the US negotiating team in nuclear negotiations with Iran, but together with Richard Nephew, she left the team after a few months due to differences with Robert Malley, the head of the US negotiating team, and also because they believed that US would lift too many sanctions on Iran and consequently the possible agreement would not be strong enough.

Controversies
After Tabatabai was appointed to her position in the US State Department, she was the target of right-wing attacks on social media. Accusations and conspiracy theories about Tabatabai were first spread on Twitter, accusing her of surrendering to the Islamic Republic of Iran. These accusations made their way to right-wing media, including The Washington Free Beacon and Saudi medias.

Books
 Tabatabai, A. (2020). No conquest, no defeat: Iran's national security strategy. London: Hurst & Company.
 Tabatabai, A. (2021). TRIPLE-AXIS: Iran's relations with Russia and china. S.l. : BLOOMSBURY.

References

External links 
 Foreign Policy Research Institute
 c-span_Ariane Tabatabai

Living people
Iranian women
People from Tabriz
Alumni of King's College London
State University of New York alumni
RAND Corporation people